Defending champion Yui Kamiji and her partner Dana Mathewson defeated Diede de Groot and Aniek van Koot in the final, 6–1, 7–5 to win the ladies' doubles wheelchair tennis title at the 2022 Wimbledon Championships.

Kamiji and Jordanne Whiley were the reigning champions, but Whiley retired from professional wheelchair tennis in November 2021.

Seeds

Draw

Finals

References

Sources
 Entry List
 Draw

Women's Wheelchair Doubles
Wimbledon Championship by year – Wheelchair women's doubles